Two Tenor Winner is an album by saxophonist Clifford Jordan's Quintet with Junior Cook which was recorded in the Netherlands in 1984 and released on the Dutch Criss Cross Jazz label.

Reception

In his review on Allmusic, Scott Yanow called it "High-quality hard bop with a bit of competitiveness resulting in some fiery moments"

Track listing 
 "Half and Half" (Charles Davis) - 9:46
 "Song of Her" (Cecil McBee) - 5:05
 "Groovin' High" (Dizzy Gillespie) - 9:56
 "The Water Bearer" (Kirk Lightsey) - 8:05
 "Make the Man Love Me" (Dorothy Fields, Arthur Schwartz) - 6:10
 "Two Tenor Winner" (Charles Mims, Jr.) - 7:21
 "Doug's Prelude" (Clifford Jordan) - 2:43

Personnel 
Clifford Jordan, Junior Cook - tenor saxophone 
Kirk Lightsey - piano
Cecil McBee - bass
Eddie Gladden - drums

References 

Clifford Jordan albums
1984 albums
Criss Cross Jazz albums